The 1991–92 Kansas Jayhawks men's basketball team represented the University of Kansas in the 1991–92 NCAA Division I men's basketball season, which was the Jayhawks' 94th basketball season. The head coach was Roy Williams, who served his 4th year at KU. The team played its home games in Allen Fieldhouse in Lawrence, Kansas.

Roster

Big Eight Conference standings 

Source:

Schedule 

|-

|-

|-
!colspan=9| Big Eight tournament

|-
!colspan=9| NCAA tournament

Rankings 

*There was no coaches poll in week 1.

See also 
 1992 NCAA Division I men's basketball tournament

References 

Kansas Jayhawks men's basketball seasons
Kansas
Jay
Jay
Kansas